Mount Britton may be:

 Mount Britton, Queensland, a former mining town and now ghost town in Australia
 Mount Britton (Puerto Rico)